Steve Lawson (born 1972) is a British bass guitarist. Based in Birmingham, England, Lawson regularly tours in the United States and Europe. He has supported Level 42 and 21st Century Schizoid Band, worked as a third of the political doom metal band #TORYCORE, and performed and recorded as a duo with his wife, singer Lobelia.

Lawson releases his music through his Pillow Mountain label and Bandcamp. His albums have included solo works, duets, and trio with live looping, mingling layers of sounds generated from a bass guitar. As a music journalist he contributes to Bassist, Guitarist magazine, The Independent On Sunday, Third Way magazine, Bass Player, and Bass Guitar magazine.

He teaches bass guitar in Birmingham. In 2015 Bass Guitar magazine published an in depth interview with him.

Equipment
He uses two Modulus 6-string basses, one fretted and one fretless. He uses a Looperlative LP1 for looping and a majority of his effects are provided by the two Lexicon G2 multi-effects processors. Lawson also uses an Elrick Steve Lawson SLC signature bass guitar.

Discography
 And Nothing but the Bass (2000)	
 Lessons Learned from an Aged Feline, Pt I (2001)	
 Not Dancing for Chicken (2002)	
 Grace and Gratitude (2004)	
 Lessons Learned From an Aged Feline, Pt II (2004)	
 Behind Every Word (2006)	
 Lessons Learned From an Aged Feline, Pt III (2006)		
 Ten Years On: Live in London (2010)	
 11 Reasons Why 3 is Greater than Everything (2011)	
 Believe in Peace (2012)	
 What the Mind Thinks, the Heart Transmits (2014)
 Closing In (2015)
 The Way Home (2015)
 You Guys! Let's Just Talk About Nail Varnish! (2015)
 A Crack Where the Light Gets In (2015)
 Referendum (2016)
 The Surrender of Time (2016)
 Hands Music (2016)
 Towards a Better Question (2017)
 PS, You Are Brilliant (2017)
 Small Is Beautiful (2017)

Collaborations
 Conversations (2003) with Jez Carr
 For the Love of Open Spaces (2003) with Theo Travis
 It's Not Going to Happen (2003) with Theo Travis
 Calamateur v Steve Lawson (2007) with Calamateur
 Live in Nebraska (2008) with Lobelia
 Numbers (2008) as Lawson/Dodds/Wood (with Roy Dodds & Patrick Wood)
 Slow Food (2010) with Trip Wamsley
 Infralab (2010) with Trip Wamsley
 Live So Far (2010) with Lobelia (wife)
 Hidden Windows (2012) with Neil Alexander
 Invenzioni (2012) with Mike Outram
 Nothing Can Prepare (2012) with Andy Williamson
 The Fingerpainting Sessions (2013) with Daniel Berkman
 Diversion (2014) with Jon Thorne
 Marinate (2014) with Julie Slick
 Tangents (2014) with Murphy McCaleb
 Explore  (2015) with Ruth Goller
 Live at the Tower of Song as Lawson/Edwards/Godfrey with Andy Edwards & Jen Godfrey
 Winter Song  (2015) as Lawson/Edwards/Corbett with Andy Edwards & Bryan Corbet
 Ley Lines  (2015) as Phi Yaan-Zek, Steve Lawson & Andy Edwards
 Language Is a Music (2016) as Steve Lawson & Michael Manring
 The Quiet After the Drums (2016) as Phi Yaan-Zek & Steve Lawson
 Ley Lines II  (2017) as Phi Yaan-Zek, Steve Lawson & Andy Edwards
 Over Time (2017) as Steve Lawson & Andy Edwards
 Intersect  (2917) as Steve Lawson & Pete Fraser
 Illuminated Loops (2017) as Steve Lawson & Poppy Porter

References

External links
 Official site
 Interview on FretlessBass.com
 Bass Guitar

1972 births
Living people
Date of birth missing (living people)
British jazz bass guitarists
English male guitarists
Male bass guitarists
21st-century English bass guitarists
21st-century British male musicians
British male jazz musicians